John Phillpotts may refer to:
 John Phillpotts (MP), English politician
 John Phillpotts (land agent), his father, landowner and entrepreneur

See also
 John Philpot, English Protestant martyr